The Bitter Southerner is a digital publication that was created on August 6, 2013, by Chuck Reece, Dave Whitling, Kyle Tibbs Jones, and Butler Raines. The publication is headquartered in Atlanta, Georgia. The website publishes feature length stories and photographic essays about an often-overlooked aspect of Southern culture: the progressive South. In addition to its magazine-style content, the organization also produces a podcast, compiles videos, and curates a folklore project.  It has been described in the New York Times as a kind of  "kitchen-sink New Yorker." The Bitter Southerner also maintains a social media presence. Their invitation-only Facebook Group (The Bitter Southerner Family) for contributors, who refer to each other as Cousins,  provides a space to gather and discuss everything from their affinity for Duke's Mayonnaise to regional music, literature, and art.

After one year of operations in 2014, The Bitter Southerner web page had an average of 50,000 unique visitors and 12,000 subscribers to its newsletter. In 2020, the Atlanta Journal-Constitution stated that The Bitter Southerner averages 138,000 pageviews a month from 90,000 unique visitors. In the same article, it was announced that Reece would be leaving the publication after 7 years. The publication describes its two major reader bases as Southerners who have since moved elsewhere and non-Southerners who have moved to the South. The publication has been supported by prominent Southerners like Patterson Hood of the Drive-By Truckers, singer-songwriter Rosanne Cash, and chef Hugh Acheson.

For his work with The Bitter Southerner, TIME Magazine named Chuck Reece as one of their 31 people changing the South in 2018.In this article, Reece describes a "Bitter Southerner," their reader base as "… somebody who loves this region but also is willing to acknowledge and not gloss over the many difficult pieces of its history."

During their 2021 Membership Drive, the publication announced the creation of The B.S. Magazine: a print magazine with stories, poetry, and art from across the South.

History 

Reece and his co-founders launched The Bitter Southerner because they got "pissed off...Bitter as it were." It was partially the lack of inclusion of a single Southern drinking establishment on Drinks International's list of the Top 50 bars in the world that pushed them to launch the publication. The name -- "The Bitter Southerner"—reveals the original concept of a cocktail blog. Reece states that the title "[is] like a quadruple entendre."

This exclusion was not the only reason behind the site's creation; more broadly, the perpetuation of Southern stereotypes was at the heart of the team's bitterness. With that in mind, the publication set out to do two key things: own the truths inscribed in those stereotypes while demonstrating that they conceal the region's diversity.

Mission 
To more clearly articulate the publication's purpose, the organization crafted a set of "7 Tenets of a Better South" in 2018. Those tenets are:

 In a Better South, every child would learn the true story of the American Civil War, unlike their ancestors. They would know our region fought to maintain one of the foulest, most unjust practices ever to pollute God's earth. They would see no nobility in an ignoble fight. And they would know, consequently, the work of reconciliation must continue through their generation and beyond.
 In a Better South, every person would respect the individuality of every other person. We said it this way when we wrote our vision statement four years ago: "The Bitter Southerner exists to support anyone who yearns to claim their Southern identity proudly and without shame — regardless of their age, race, gender, ethnic background, place of origin, politics, sexual orientation, creed, religion, or lack of religion."
 In a Better South, people of different colors and cultures would be unafraid to have difficult conversations, because they would know the bond of friendship requires true understanding — and some risk-taking to get there.
 In a Better South, no credence would go to anyone who comes from a place of racism, homophobia, transphobia, or gender discrimination. An intolerant South, one that does not accept the basic equality of all people, can never be a Better South. Nor can it be a prosperous South — not when the fastest growing parts of its economy depend on a generation of young people who refuse to countenance intolerance.
 A Better South would give no quarter to anyone who believes others — simply by nature of who they are — are inferior. We would see every human as equal in God's eyes.
 In a Better South, religious intolerance would have no place. No one ever wins when we fight about which God to pray to, or whether to pray to none at all.
 In a Better South, our greatest celebrations would be reserved for the people who crossed old barriers to create the South's greatest contributions to American culture. Folks like the black and white kids who mixed it up to invent soul music in Memphis and Muscle Shoals. Folks like the ones who first threw the okra into the gumbo.

Awards 
2019 James Beard Award for Foodways Writing: Shane Mitchell, "A Hunger for Tomatoes"

2019 James Beard Award for Profile Writing: Michael Adno, "The Short and Brilliant Life of Ernest Matthew Mickler"

2018 James Beard Award / M.F.K. Fisher Distinguished Writing Award: Shane Mitchell, "Who Owns Uncle Ben?"

2016 James Beard Award for Profile Writing: Wendell Brock, "Christiane Lauterbach: The Woman Who Ate Atlanta"

References

External links 
 

2013 establishments in the United States
American news websites
Internet properties established in 2013